China National Highway 227 runs from Zhangye, Gansu to Pu'er, Yunnan. It is 3,745 kilometres in length and runs south from Zhangye towards Pu'er.

Route and distance

See also
 China National Highways

External links
Official website of Ministry of Transport of PRC

227
Transport in Gansu
Transport in Qinghai